The 1968 New York Yankees season was the 66th season for the team. The team finished above .500 for the first time since 1964, with a record of 83–79, finishing 20 games behind the Detroit Tigers. New York was managed by Ralph Houk. The Yankees played at Yankee Stadium. The 1968 season was notable for being Mickey Mantle's final season before he announced his retirement the following spring. The Yankees batted .214 as a team, the lowest total ever for the live-ball era (as of 2022).

Offseason 
 November 28, 1967: Andy Kosco was drafted by the Yankees from the Oakland Athletics in the 1967 rule 5 draft.
 November 30, 1967: Gene Michael was purchased by the Yankees from the Los Angeles Dodgers.
 December 7, 1967: Bob Tillman and Dale Roberts were traded by the Yankees to the Atlanta Braves for Bobby Cox.
 Prior to 1968 season: Merritt Ranew was acquired by the Yankees from the California Angels.

Regular season 
In 1968, Yankees executive E. Michael Burke was a candidate to become Commissioner of Baseball. Bowie Kuhn would eventually get the appointment.

Season standings

Record vs. opponents

Notable transactions 
 June 7, 1968: 1968 Major League Baseball Draft
Thurman Munson was drafted by the Yankees in the 1st round (4th pick).
Wayne Nordhagen was drafted by the Yankees in the 7th round.
 July 15, 1968: Rocky Colavito was signed as a free agent by the Yankees.
 September 30, 1968: Rocky Colavito was released by the Yankees.

Roster

Player stats

Batting

Starters by position 
Note: Pos = Position; G = Games played; AB = At bats; R= Runs; H = Hits; Avg. = Batting average; HR = Home runs; RBI = Runs batted in; SB = Stolen bases

Other batters 
Note: G = Games played; AB = At bats; R= Runs; H = Hits; Avg. = Batting average; HR = Home runs; RBI = Runs batted in; SB = Stolen bases

Pitching

Starting pitchers 
Note: G = Games pitched; IP = Innings pitched; W = Wins; L = Losses; ERA = Earned run average; SO = Strikeouts

Other pitchers 
Note: G = Games pitched; IP = Innings pitched; W = Wins; L = Losses; ERA = Earned run average; SO = Strikeouts

Relief pitchers 
Note: G = Games pitched; W = Wins; L = Losses; SV = Saves; ERA = Earned run average; SO = Strikeouts

Farm system 

LEAGUE CHAMPIONS: Oneonta

Notes

References 
1968 New York Yankees at Baseball Reference
1968 New York Yankees team page at www.baseball-almanac.com

New York Yankees seasons
New York Yankees
New York Yankees
1960s in the Bronx